How Do I Marry the Boss? is a 1927 German silent comedy film directed by Erich Schönfelder and starring Henri De Vries, Robert Garrison, and Dina Gralla. The film's sets were designed by the art director Max Heilbronner.

Cast
In alphabetical order
Henri De Vries
Robert Garrison
Dina Gralla
Hélène Hallier
Harry Halm
Albert Paulig
Else Reval
Rosa Valetti
Kurt Vespermann

References

External links

Films of the Weimar Republic
German comedy films
German silent feature films
1927 comedy films
Films directed by Erich Schönfelder
German black-and-white films
Silent comedy films
1920s German films